Events in the year 2009 in Chad. 

In general, the year was mostly one with rampant negative issues regarding political instability and other undesirable conditions of a country.

Incumbents
 President: Idriss Déby
 Prime Minister: Youssouf Saleh Abbas
Déby and Abbas were incumbent throughout the year following the 2006 Chadian presidential election, in which Déby had won a majority of the votes.

Events

May 
May 9 - Chad captures 150 rebels near Am-Dam after having crossed over the eastern border with Sudan. This was a single event in part of a larger conflict.
May 15 - Sudan accused Chad for two air bombardments in its territory done by the Chadian government to attack Chadian rebel groups' bases in Sudan.

October 
October 9 - Activists voiced concerns with Chadian government over oil pipeline backed by the China National Petroleum Corporation (CNPC) over environmental and human displacement concerns.
October 15 - The Food and Agriculture Organization declared a humanitarian disaster within the country as Lake Chad continued to shrink, increasing water scarcity for many residents.

References

 
Years of the 21st century in Chad
2000s in Chad
Chad
Chad